Damodar is a railway station on the  Asansol–Tatanagar–Kharagpur line, just east of the Damodar River.  It is located in Asansol, Paschim Bardhaman district in the Indian state of West Bengal.

History

Electrification
The Asansol–Purulia sector was electrified in 1961–62.

Important junction point
Damodar is the last station before the entry lines of the raw materials yard (Damodar Yard) of IISCO Steel Plant, which has been modernised at a cost of Rs. 16,408 crores.

To the north of Damodar railway station runs the line to numerous railway sidings for coal loading. The Damodar-Radhanagar sector of the coal sidings line was electrified in 1963–64.

To the south is the link to Kalipahari on the Bardhaman–Asansol section for freight trains (mainly iron ore rakes for Durgapur Steel Plant) to bypass Asansol . This line was electrified in 1961–62.

References

External links
 Trains at Damodar

Railway stations in Paschim Bardhaman district
Adra railway division